Yagmyrmyrat Kulanmyradovich Annamyradov (born 19 October 1982) is a retired  Turkmen professional footballer,  who played as defender. He was part of the Turkmenistan national team from 2007.

Club career 
Yagmyrmyrat Annamyradow began his professional career in 1998 in SMM+ football team.

In the Ýokary Liga perform for Köpetdag Aşgabat, Asudalyk, FC HTTU and FC Merw. On 2007 Annamyradow  joined the Uzbek League club Navbahor Namangan. In 2009, he returned to Turkmenistan, to FC HTTU. Since 2010, the player of FC Balkan, is the team captain.

On 2017, Annamyradow announced his retirement as a professional footballer. The Football Federation of the Balkan Region appreciated the contribution of Annamyradow to the development of football by presenting the player with commemorative prizes and a diploma.

Coaching career 
On 2018, he was hired as coach by the Ýokary Liga club FC Balkan.

On 2019, he was appointed an assistant coach at FC Şagadam with Aleksandr Klimenko as the head coach.

Honours

Club
FC Balkan
Ýokary Liga: 2004, 2010, 2011, 2012
 AFC President's Cup: 2013
 Turkmenistan Cup: 2010, 2012
 Turkmenistan Super Cup: 2006, 2011, 2012

References

External links
 
 
 

1982 births
Living people
Turkmenistan footballers
Turkmenistan international footballers
Expatriate footballers in Uzbekistan
Turkmenistan expatriate sportspeople in Uzbekistan
Turkmenistan expatriate footballers
Association football defenders
Footballers at the 2002 Asian Games
Asian Games competitors for Turkmenistan